Osceola Technical College is a public school in unincorporated Osceola County, Florida.  It awards certificates in programs designed to train individuals for entry-level employment and to improve current job skills for employed students.

References

Vocational education in the United States